Errata (also spelled Erata) is an unincorporated community in Jones County, Mississippi.

Errata is located on the Norfolk Southern Railway and was once home to nine different sawmills and a grocery store.

Albennie Jones, a blues and jazz singer who recorded in the mid and late 1940s, was born in Errata.

References 

Unincorporated communities in Jones County, Mississippi
Unincorporated communities in Mississippi